The Ten Commandments are a set of biblical principles relating to ethics and worship, which play a fundamental role in Judaism and most forms of Christianity.

Ten Commandments may also refer to:

Rules
 Ritual Decalogue, the laws listed in the Book of Exodus, 34:11–26
 Ten Commandments for Drivers
 Ten Commandments of Computer Ethics
 "Hutu Ten Commandments", a propaganda document published in 1990 in Rwanda
 Alternatives to the Ten Commandments, secular and humanist alternatives to the biblical list
 The Ten Commandments of the Mafia, the ten primary rules of the mafia

Film and TV
 The Ten Commandments (1923 film), a 1923 silent film directed by Cecil B. DeMille, starring Theodore Roberts
 The Ten Commandments (1945 film), an Italian film
 The Ten Commandments (1956 film), a 1956 epic film directed by Cecil B. DeMille, starring Charlton Heston
 The Ten Commandments (2007 film), an animated film starring the voices of Ben Kingsley and Christian Slater
 The Ten Commandments: The Musical, a 2006 musical film starring Val Kilmer as Moses
 The Ten Commandments (TV series), a two-part 2006 television mini-series, directed by Robert Dornhelm
 Exodus: Gods and Kings, a 2014 film starring Christian Bale, which was based on the biblical story of Moses and the Ten Commandments
 Os Dez Mandamentos (Moses and the Ten Commandments), a 2015 Brazilian primetime telenovela
 The Ten Commandments: The Movie, a 2016 Brazilian film based on the 2015 primetime telenovela

Music
 Les Dix Commendements (musical), a 2000 French musical by  Élie Chouraqui et Pascal Obispo

Albums
 Ten Commandments (Ozzy Osbourne album)
 Ten Commandments (Sammi Cheng album), 1994
 The Ten Commandments (Malevolent Creation album), the first album from the death metal band Malevolent Creation

Songs
 "Ten Commandments" (song), a song by Lil' Mo
"Ten Commandments", a song by New Model Army (band)  1986
"Ten Commandments", a song by Prince Buster	 	1963

See also 
 Ten Commandments in Roman Catholicism
 Decalogue (disambiguation)
 The Eleventh Commandment (disambiguation)
 613 commandments
 The 614th Commandment